The Fiat 131 is a family sedan manufactured and marketed by Fiat from 1974 to 1984 after its debut at the 1974 Turin Motor Show.  Available as a two-door and four-door saloon and 5-door estate across a single generation, the 131 succeeded the Fiat 124.

The 131 was also marketed as the Fiat Mirafiori, after the Turin suburb where the cars were manufactured. Initially, the 131 was offered with 1.3 L and 1.6 L overhead valve engines and the range received revisions in 1978 and 1981.  Production reached 1,513,800.

Specifications
The Fiat 131 used steel monocoque bodywork for its three-box design and used a front engine, rear-wheel drive layout, where the engine is longitudinally front-mounted. The gearbox is directly behind the engine, and a tubular propeller shaft, under the transmission "tunnel", transmits the drive to a solid live rear axle.

The engines were all inline-four types, derived from those used in the outgoing 124 range, with a cast iron cylinder block and aluminium alloy cylinder head. Initially the 131 was offered only with pushrod valve gear, which offered the innovation of being the worldwide first engine with OHV valve gear and a belt driven camshaft. Only later in the model’s life came the well known double overhead camshaft (DOHC) engines which used a toothed timing belt. Fuel supply was via a single Weber ADF twin-choke carburettor, fed from a trunk mounted steel fuel tank. Traditional contact breaker ignition systems were used, usually with Marelli distributors.

The suspension system utilised fully independent front suspension, with MacPherson struts, track control arms and anti-roll bar. The rear suspension was quite advanced (when using a solid live rear axle), in that the rear axle was controlled by double unequal length trailing arms and a panhard rod, with coil springs and direct acting dampers. This design proved far superior to many of its contemporaries, especially with respect to vehicle stability and handling.

The braking system was also typical; the front brakes were disc brakes, using a solid iron disc and a single-piston sliding caliper. The rears were drum brakes (a technological backwards step from the 124, which used discs all round), utilising leading and trailing shoe design operated by a dual piston fixed slave cylinder. They were operated hydraulically, with a tandem master cylinder assisted by a vacuum servo using two separate circuits. A rear-mounted load sensing valve varied the bias of effort applied to the rear brakes, dependent on the load being carried (and also the pitch dynamics caused by braking effort and road levels). A centrally located floor mounted handbrake operated on the rear axle using bowden cables.

The car's interior had its secondary dashboard switches illuminated by a central bulb with fibre optic distribution to the switches.

Series 1, 1974–78
The Fiat 131 Mirafiori was introduced at the 55th Turin Motor Show in late October 1974.
Both engines were fitted with a single twin-choke Weber 32 ADF downdraught carburettor. A 4-speed manual transmission was standard, with a 5-speed manual and a 3-speed torque converter automatic optional on the 1600 engine only.

The initial range comprised eleven different models. There were three body styles: 2-door saloon, 4-door saloon and Familiare station wagon (Estate on the British market). Station wagons were built by SEAT in Spain, but were labelled Fiats for all non-Spanish markets.
Trim levels were two; the entry-level 131 Mirafiori (also known as "Normale" or "Standard") had single square headlamps, wheels and dished hubcap from the 124, and simplified interior furnishings. Next was the better appointed 131 Mirafiori Special (or simply "S"), which could be distinguished from the base model by its quadruple circular headlamps, specific grille, side rubbing strips, chrome window surrounds, and rubber bumper inserts. Inside it added different instrumentation with triple square dials, a padded adjustable steering wheel, cloth upholstery, and reclining seats. Additionally the more sophisticated options—such as air conditioning, tachometer, limited slip differential and vinyl roof—were exclusive to the Special. Each body style could be combined with either of the engines and trim levels—save for the Special estate which only came with the larger engine.
US market versions had a SOHC 1.8 litre inline-four and were available with a GM three-speed automatic transmission.

Salvatore Diomante's Autocostruzioni S.D., located near Turin, offered a nearly 5-metre long "131 Diplomatic" limousine conversion.

{| class="wikitable" style="text-align:center; font-size:90%;"
! Model || Engine code || Engine type ||style="line-height:1.2em;"| Displacementbore × stroke || Carburetor || Power
|-
|style="line-height:1.2em;"| Mirafiori 1300
|rowspan=3| 131A.000 || rowspan="7" | OHV I4 ||rowspan=3|  || rowspan="7" | single twin-chokeWeber 32 ADF ||rowspan=3|  
|- style="line-height:1.2em;"
| Mirafiori Special 1300
|- style="line-height:1.2em;"
| Familiare 1300
|-
|style="line-height:1.2em;"| Mirafiori 1600
|rowspan=4| 131A1.000 || rowspan="4" | || rowspan="4" | 
|- style="line-height:1.2em;"
| Mirafiori Special 1300
|- style="line-height:1.2em;"
| Familiare 1600
|- style="line-height:1.2em;"
| Familiare Special 1600
|-
| Abarth Rally ||n/a
| DOHC 16-valve I4 ||  || single twin-chokeWeber 34 ADF ||  
|-
|US version
|131A1.040
|SOHC I4
|
|n/a
|
|}

Fiat 131 Abarth Rally
In 1976, 400 examples of the Fiat 131 Abarth Rally were built for homologation purposes. These cars were built in a cooperation between Fiat, Bertone and Abarth. Bertone took part-completed two door standard bodyshells from the production line in Mirafiori, fitted plastic mudguards front and rear, a plastic bonnet and bootlid and modified the metal structure to accept the rear independent suspension. The cars were fully painted and trimmed and then delivered back to the Fiat special Rivalta plant where they received the Abarth mechanicals.

The street cars used the standard gearbox with no synchromesh (Rally type regulations required the use of the same type of synchromesh on the competition cars as on the street versions) and the hopelessly underdimensioned brake system of the small Fiat 127. Competition cars used dry sump lubrication and eventually Kugelfischer mechanical fuel injection.

Series 2

The 131 got a minor facelift in 1978. New DOHC, or "Twin Cam" (TC) engines arrived, and these models were badged as Supermirafiori. The biggest changes exterior-wise for the Series 2 were larger rectangular shaped front lights (quad round headlights in the US), new bumpers (for the Supermirafiori), new bigger rear lights, while a new interior (CL, Supermirafiori) included the dashboard and a chunky, single-spoke steering wheel.

Also in 1978, the 2-door sporting version Racing (Mirafiori Sport in the UK) with  twin cam engine, was launched. This car had four round headlights (the inner headlights being smaller than the outer ones, unlike any other Mirafiori model produced), different grille, spoilers and extended wheel arches, and a short-throw 5 speed gearbox. Diesel engined versions also had four round headlights (equally sized), and a noticeable (and characteristic) bump in the hood to accommodate the taller engine. The Familiare (estate) was renamed as Panorama.

In Venezuela, the 131 Series 2 was kept in production after the Series 3 had been introduced in Europe. An additional version was the sporting "131 Corsa 95", which used the 131 Racing's front spoiler, grille, rear spoiler, and other parts (still with four doors) along with the twin cam Supermirafiori engine and a sizable bonnet scoop. In Venezuela, this engine produced a claimed  at 6000 rpm.

The Series 2 was marketed in the United States as the Fiat Brava (two-door only) and Super Brava from mid-year 1978 with the same 1.8 litre four as had been used in the US-market 131, but before the year was over this was replaced by the somewhat more powerful and much torquier 2 litre twin-cam four also seen in the Spider. Initially, the better equipped models were sold as Super Bravas, but the base model and "Super" tag were dropped for 1979. The interim Brava version also retained the 131's interior. Importantly, the air conditioning system was also upgraded to cope with the demands of US drivers. For 1980 a more powerful fuel-injected version was added while the Estate version was dropped. For 1981 the EFI engine became standard equipment and the headlamps were changed for single rectangular units, but this was to be the last year for the Brava/131 in the US. The January 1991, edition of Popular Mechanics in the United States listed the 1979 Fiat 131 in the "Overall Worst" category as the most "trouble prone" car ever recorded in their Owner Report histories.

131 Hybrid
Power is also provided by regeneration via the braking system. The 250 amp batteries are located in the boot, adding  to the weight.

Series 3
The 131 was updated again in March 1981. By this time, the car was no longer offered in the USA. Production of the Racing/Sport versions ceased, although these were sold well into 1982. The same 2.0 TC (twin cam) engine went to the Supermirafiori. The car was renamed 131 Super Brava in Australia. The car received a slightly updated interior (instruments, single-piece glovebox lid), whilst lower rubbing strips found their way onto all models up to CL specification. The Supermirafiori received larger lower door cladding. Mechanically, Mirafiori versions now received overhead cam engines rather than pushrod versions; a new 1.4 litre engine and a revised 1.6 litre. Also new were the clutch and gearboxes, a tweaked suspension was also introduced and the gas tank increased in size by three litres, for a total  capacity.

In June 1981, a new sport version, the Volumetrico Abarth, was introduced to some markets, with a supercharged version of the familiar 2-litre twin-cam. This car, also known as the 2000 TC Compressore, was built in a small series (about 200 units) and could reach .

In 1983, the production of the saloon version was discontinued, but the estate, now named 131 Maratea, remained in production with two engine choices (115 PS 2.0 TC and 72 PS 2.5 D) until 1984, when they were replaced with the Ritmo-based Regata Weekend. These last versions featured four round headlights and the by-now familiar five-bar grille.

In Australia the saloon was also updated for a final time for the 1984 model year. It also received the 4 round headlight and five bar grille. Other subtle revisions were also made to the vehicles wiring with the central locking button removed and integrated into central locking motors. Wheels were upgraded to a 14 inch size with unique offset . Driveshaft universal joint size was increased . Steering rack ends and tie rod ends were sizing was also changed. Brake master cylinder bore size was increased to 20mm and brake fittings changed to a metric fine thread size.

Motorsport

The 131 as a rally car
Fiat 131 Rally's precursor the 3.5-litre Group 5 Abarth SE 031 won 1975 Giro d'Italia automobilistico. The Fiat 131 Abarth was a very successful group 4 rally car, winning the manufacturers' World Rally Championship three times: in 1977, 1978, and in 1980.
With this car Markku Alen won the 1978 FIA Cup for Drivers and Walter Röhrl won the 1980 drivers' World Rally Championship.
Between 1976 and 1981 the Fiat 131 won 20 WRC events; other notable drivers were Sandro Munari, Timo Salonen, Attilio Bettega and Michèle Mouton.

Between 1975 and 1977 the official "works" cars carried the Olio Fiat blue and yellow livery, then during 1978 and 1979 seasons they were sponsored by Italian airline Alitalia and bore their distinctive red, white and green livery.

World Rally Championship event victories
Fiat Abarth 131s recorded victories in the following World Rally Championship events:

{|class="wikitable" style="font-size: 95%; "
! No.
! Event
! Season
! Driver
! Co-driver
|-
| 1
|  26th 1000 Lakes Rally
| 1976
|  Markku Alén
|  Ilkka Kivimäki
|-
| 2
|  10o Rallye de Portugal Vinho do Porto
| 1977
|  Markku Alén
|  Ilkka Kivimäki
|-
| 3
|  8th South Pacific Rally
| 1977
|  Fulvio Bacchelli
|  Francesco Rossetti
|-
| 4
|  5ème Critérium Molson du Québec
| 1977
|  Timo Salonen
|  Seppo Harjanne
|-
| 5
|  19o Rallye Sanremo
| 1977
|  Jean-Claude Andruet
|  Christian Delferrier
|-
| 6
|  21ème Tour de Corse
| 1977
|  Bernard Darniche
|  Alain Mahé
|-
| 7
|  11º Rallye de Portugal Vinho do Porto
| 1978
|  Markku Alén
|  Ilkka Kivimäki
|-
| 8
|  25th Acropolis Rally
| 1978
|  Walter Röhrl
|  Christian Geistdörfer
|-
| 9
|  38 Rajd Polski
| 1978
|  Antonio Zanini
|  Juan Petisco
|-
| 10
|  28th 1000 Lakes Rally
| 1978
|  Markku Alén
|  Ilkka Kivimäki
|-
| 11
|  6ème Critérium Molson du Québec
| 1978
|  Walter Röhrl
|  Christian Geistdörfer
|-
| 12
|  37ème Tour de France Automobile
| 1978
|  Michèle Mouton
|  Françoise Conconi
|-
| 13
|  22ème Tour de Corse
| 1978
|  Bernard Darniche
|  Alain Mahé
|-
| 14
|  29th 1000 Lakes Rally
| 1979
|  Markku Alén
|  Ilkka Kivimäki
|-
| 15
|  48ème Rallye Automobile de Monte-Carlo
| 1980
|  Walter Röhrl
|  Christian Geistdörfer
|-
| 16
|  14o Rallye de Portugal Vinho do Porto
| 1980
|  Walter Röhrl
|  Christian Geistdörfer
|-
| 17
|  2o Rally Codasur
| 1980
|  Walter Röhrl
|  Christian Geistdörfer
|-
| 18
|  30th 1000 Lakes Rally
| 1980
|  Markku Alén
|  Ilkka Kivimäki
|-
| 19
|  22o Rallye Sanremo
| 1980
|  Walter Röhrl
|  Christian Geistdörfer
|-
| 20
|  15º Rallye de Portugal Vinho do Porto
| 1981
|  Markku Alén
|  Ilkka Kivimäki
|-
|}

Other motorsports
In 1978, American actor James Brolin campaigned a Fiat 131 Abarth on a limited schedule in the GTU category of the IMSA GT Championship. The car carried sponsorship from Anheuser-Busch Natural Light beer, which had been introduced the previous year.

Non-Italian 131 variations

SEAT 131

The SEAT 131 started its production in early 1975 in Barcelona with two versions initially offered: SEAT 131 L, featuring rectangular front lamps, 1,438 cc OHC engine and 4 speed gearbox and SEAT 131 E featuring four round headlamps, 1,592 cc DOHC engine and 5 speed gearbox. The range grew up in 1976 with the SEAT 131 Familiar, estate version offered with both engines. In 1977 the 131 Automatico (Automatic gearbox) was released and the following year a very short production of the SEAT 131 CLX 1800 was offered. Spain was the only place where the estate 131 was built, but in the export these were labelled Fiat 131 Familiare.

In 1978, the SEAT 131 evolved into the SEAT 131 Mirafiori/Supermirafiori (Panorama for the estate versions), with the same changes as seen on its Italian cousin. The engines remained largely the same, but a 1.8 litre Diesel Perkins 4.108 engine was available in 1979.

A further CLX special edition was launched in 1980. Available only in metallic silver or metallic bronze colours, this 131 CLX had a 1,919 cc engine, developing  at 5,800 rpm.

In 1981, the Diesel version was developed with a new Sofim engine. This 2,500 cc engine was much more powerful than the Perkins version (72 hp against only 49 hp) and was one of the most successful taxis in early '80s Spain.

In 1982, the SEAT 131 changed again, gathering all the body changes seen on the Fiat 131 series 3. The 131 was now available in CL, Supermirafiori and Diplomatic versions. The Diplomatic was the top of the range, with a 1,995 cc engine and features such as power steering, power windows or air conditioning. The Panorama versions were the cars chosen by the "Cuerpo Nacional de Policia" (Spanish Police force) as patrol cars.

In 1984, the SEAT 131 range was discontinued, without a direct substitute and the Fiat Ritmo-based SEAT Málaga took its place in 1985.

Murat 131

Turkish Automotive Factories Incorporated (Tofaş) in Turkey started the production of Fiat 131s built under Fiat license with the Murat 131 (Turkish: Desire) nameplate.  Later, Fiat 131 based "Bird Series" were developed and built in Bursa, Turkey. The base version of "Bird Series" was named as Murat 131 Şahin (Turkish: Hawk), luxury version was as Murat 131 Doğan (Turkish: Falcon) and the estate version was named as Murat 131 Kartal (Turkish: Eagle). These vehicles enjoyed a very long production run (1986-2002 at Turkey, 1991-2009 at Egypt, 2006-2010 at Ethiopia), and were later replaced by newer Fiat models.

Polski Fiat 131p
Assembly of the 131 sedan was also undertaken in Poland by Fabryka Samochodów Osobowych (FSO) in the years 1975 to 1981, and 3102 were assembled in total. They were often used by state institutions and communist party officials. First series cars were available only in Special trim and were called Polski Fiat 131p Mirafiori. Cars of second series were known under the name Fiat 131p Mirafiori and were offered in L and CL trim levels.

Other producers
The Fiat 131 was also produced at Helwan, in Egypt, by El Nasr since at least 1982, on the basis of complete knockdown (CKD) kits. This was followed by CKD assembly of the Tofaş Murat 131 between 1991-2009. The Tofaş Murat 131 has also been assembled in Ethiopia by Holland Car between 2006-2010.

Other CKD production of the Fiat 131 has taken place in the following countries:
 Córdoba; Argentina, FIAT Córdoba.
 Bogotá, Colombia; (Compañía Colombiana Automotriz).
 San José, Costa Rica (S.A.V.A.).
 Jakarta, Indonesia (P.T. Daha Motor, Saloon and Station Wagon).
 Kuala Lumpur, Malaysia.
 Casablanca, Morocco (SOMACA).
 Lisbon, Portugal (Fiat Portuguesa SARL, Somave Sarl)
 Singapore (Sharikat Fiat Distributors).
 Bangkok, Thailand (Karnasuta General Assembly Co.).
 Caracas, Venezuela (FIAT de Venezuela C.A.).
 Livingstone, Zambia (Livingstone Motor Assemblers Ltd)

References

External links

 131mirafiori.com
 131abarth.com
 Italia.Haven: Irish and European forum for Fiat owners

See also 
 Fiat Marengo

131
Mid-size cars
1980s cars
Cars introduced in 1974
Rear-wheel-drive vehicles
Sedans
Station wagons
Group 4 (racing) cars
Cars of Turkey